Nenad Puhovski (born 29 April 1949) is a Croatian film director and producer.

Early years 

Puhovski was born 29 April 1949 in Zagreb, Croatia (then a part of Yugoslavia) where he attended elementary and high school.

He studied sociology and philosophy at the University of Zagreb, and graduated in film directing at the Zagreb Academy of Dramatic Art.

Theatre and television
From 1975 to 1979 he worked as a dramaturge at the &TD Theatre, one of the most important independent Yugoslav theatres of the period. He directed Jenny, the Pirate's Bride (1974) and Emigrant Talks (1975) by Bertold Brecht, Pit, This is America, Too (1975) by Mile Rupčić, 1984 (1976) by George Orwell, Abduction (1977) by Željko Senečić and Travesties (1980) by Tom Stoppard. In 1990 he directed the Eurovision Song Contest 1990 in Zagreb.

Film
Puhovski directed a number of documentaries for both small and big screens, dealing mostly with social issues (Dead Harbor, Borderlines of Hunger, Graham & I, Pavilion 22, Lora – Testimonies, Together) and films about the arts (In Quest of Sutej, Five film on Nives KK, Bucan - triptych). While many of his films have been screened worldwide, domestically they had a kind of a dual destiny.

Films on social issues were often banned or not shown (Dead Harbor was banned for more than 15 years, some films on war crimes are still waiting to be shown publicly). On the other hand, films about fine arts have been awarded the highest honors at the national and international festivals.

In 1997, Puhovski founded FACTUM, an independent documentary film production company. In the following fifteen years he produced more than 60 documentaries. The most controversial documentaries (Operation Storm, Pavilion 22, Lora - Testimonies) and some of the best ones in that period (The Boy who Rushed, I have Nothing Nice to Say to You, Life in the Fresh Air, Straight A’s, Three, Think Pink, War Reporter, The Years of Rust) were produced by FACTUM.

In 2004 Puhovski founded and became the director of ZagrebDox, an annual international documentary festival in Zagreb which regularly attracts an audience of around 25,000 viewers. Apart from screening a variety of documentary films ZagrebDox is, through its seminars, pitching workshops and conferences, also becoming the focal point for documentary professionals from the entire region.

He is a member of the European Film Academy, and an honorary member of CILECT.

Teaching
As a teacher, tutor and lecturer, Puhovski has been engaged at Academy for Drama Arts in Zagreb for many years, now as a full professor. He is heading and running MA program in documentary directing & producing at that school.

In addition to that, he designed and conducted documentary workshops at the Imaginary Academy in Grožnjan, Croatia, and the International Academy of Broadcasting in Montreux, Switzerland and tutored development of documentary projects at Roma Media Creative Lab & script developing project, run by Medienhilfe & OSI and Greenhouse development program, run by the New Fund for Cinema and Television (Israel) and funded by EuroMed Audiovisual.

References

External links
Nenad Puhovski biography at Film.hr 

1949 births
Academy of Dramatic Art, University of Zagreb alumni
Croatian documentary filmmakers
Croatian film directors
Croatian film producers
Living people
Film people from Zagreb
Academic staff of the University of Zagreb